Ulrich Steinfurth, better known as Uli Stein, (26 December 1946 – 28 August 2020) was a German cartoonist.

Personal life
Stein was born Ulrich Steinfurth in Hanover as a son of a housewife and a public servant. He graduated the Goetheschule in Hanover. After a two-year conscription in the Bundeswehr, he moved to West Berlin where he studied German, Geography and Biology at the Freie Universität Berlin. Shortly before graduating, he quit his studies to work as a journalist, amongst others six years for the Saarländischer Rundfunk. At the end of the 70s, he focused on cartoons full-time. 

Stein died on 28 August 2020 in his hometown of Hanover.

Cartoons
Stein's cartoons mainly focus on day-to-day-situations, often with anthropomorphic mice, cats, dogs, penguins and pigs. He also created cartoons for other events and subjects, such as politics or soccer. Although he mainly sold books and post cards with his cartoons, there is a variety of other products based on them, such as games and articles of daily use.

By 2008, Stein had sold more than 90 million post cards and 9 million books in Germany alone and his works have been translated into a number of languages. From 1998 onward, he drew a weekly cartoon for TV Hören und Sehen, a German TV guide. With the advent of widespread internet usage, Stein began using the web as a medium for his cartoons, but was skeptical towards its use as a medium for books.

Bibliography
 Uli Stein: Mein Tagebuch. Lappan Verlag GmbH, Oldenburg 2006, .

References

External links 
 Official homepage

1946 births
2020 deaths
German cartoonists
Artists from Hanover